Caladenia whiteheadii is a plant in the orchid family Orchidaceae and is endemic to New South Wales. It is a ground orchid with a single hairy leaf and a single pale yellow flower with thick reddish tips on the sepals and petals. It is only known from a single hill near Eugowra.

Description
The tip of the labellum curls downward and there are four rows of red, mostly linear calli along the mid-line of the labellum. Flowering occurs in September and October.

Taxonomy and naming
Caladenia whiteheadii was first formally described in 2006 by David Jones who gave it the name Arachnorchis whiteheadii. The specimen was collected near Eugowra and the description was published in Australian Orchid Research. In 2010 Gary Backhouse changed the name to Caladenia whiteheadii and published the change in The Victorian Naturalist. The specific epithet (whiteheadii) honours Brian Whitehead who collected the type specimen.

Distribution and habitat
This spider orchid is only known from a single hill near Eugowra where it grows in shrubby forest.

References

whiteheadii
Endemic orchids of Australia
Orchids of New South Wales
Plants described in 2006
Taxa named by David L. Jones (botanist)